The following are the association football events of the year 1994 throughout the world.

Events
January 15 – Manager Issy ten Donkelaar is fired by Netherlands club FC Twente, and replaced by Hans Meyer from Germany.
January 19 – Erwin Koeman plays his last international match for the Netherlands national team, replacing Dennis Bergkamp in the second half of the friendly match in and against Tunisia (2–2). It is the 500th match in history of the Netherlands national team.
April 20 – Edgar Davids makes his debut for the Netherlands national team in the friendly match against the Republic of Ireland (0–1) in Tilburg.
May 14 – Manchester United wins 4–0 over Chelsea to claim the FA Cup.
May 18 – AC Milan beat Barcelona 4–0, in the Champions League Final to claim their fifth crown .
May 27 – Ruud Gullit plays his last and 66th international match for the Netherlands national team. Afterwards the striker declares he doesn't want to go to the 1994 FIFA World Cup under coach Dick Advocaat.
July 9 – The Netherlands national team is eliminated in the quarterfinals of the 1994 FIFA World Cup by eventual winners Brazil. Branco scores the decisive goal in the 3–2 win for the South Americans. Ronald Koeman (78th cap), Frank Rijkaard (73rd) and Jan Wouters (70th) play their last international match for the Netherlands.
July 17 – Brazil wins its record fourth World Cup, defeating Italy on penalties in the final of the 1994 FIFA World Cup in Pasadena, California. Superstar Diego Maradona was suspended from Cup competition for doping on Ephedrine.
August 21 – Ajax Amsterdam claims the Dutch Super Cup, the annual opening of the new season in the Eredivisie, by a 3–0 win over Feyenoord Rotterdam in the Olympisch Stadion.
November 16 – Ajax-striker Patrick Kluivert makes his debut for the Netherlands national team, replacing Youri Mulder in the 70th minute of the Euro qualifier against the Czech Republic (0–0) in Rotterdam.
December 1 – Vélez Sársfield wins the Intercontinental Cup in Tokyo, Japan by defeating Italy's AC Milan (2–0).
December 14 – Clarence Seedorf scores the fifth and last goal during his debut for the Netherlands national team against Luxembourg. Pierre van Hooijdonk also earns his first cap for the Netherlands.
Copa Libertadores 1994: Won by Vélez Sársfield after defeating São Paulo FC 5–3 on a penalty shootout after a final aggregate score of 1–1.
Scottish League Cup: Raith Rovers F.C. defeat Celtic F.C. 6–5 on penalties after the match finished 2–2.
Malaysian football is involved in one of the largest match-fixing scandals in the sport's history.

Winners club national championship

Asia
 Japan – Verdy Kawasaki
 Qatar – Al-Arabi
 South Korea – Ilhwa Chunma

Europe
 Austria – SV Salzburg
 Belgium – R.S.C. Anderlecht
 Croatia – Hajduk Split
 Denmark – Silkeborg IF
 England – Manchester United
 France – Paris Saint-Germain
 Germany – Bayern Munich
 Greece – AEK Athens
 Israel – Maccabi Haifa
 Italy – A.C. Milan
 Netherlands – Ajax Amsterdam
 Norway – Rosenborg
 Poland – Legia Warszawa
 Portugal – Benfica
 Romania – Steaua Bucharest
 Russia – Spartak Moscow
 Scotland – Rangers
 Spain – Barcelona
 Sweden – IFK Göteborg
 Turkey – Galatasaray S.K.
 Ukraine – Dynamo Kyiv
 Wales – Bangor City
 FR Yugoslavia – Partizan

North America
 Mexico – Tecos UAG
 /  – Montreal Impact (APSL)

South America
 Argentina
Clausura – Independiente
Apertura – River Plate
 Bolivia – Bolivia – Bolívar
 Brazil – Palmeiras
 Chile – Universidad de Chile
 Paraguay – Cerro Porteño
 – Sporting Cristal

International tournaments
 African Cup of Nations in Tunisia (March 26 – April 10, 1994)
 
 
 
 Baltic Cup in Vilnius, Lithuania (July 29 – 31 1994)
 
 
 
 FIFA World Cup in the United States (June 17 – July 17, 1994)

National team results

Europe



Births

January 6 – Denis Suárez, Spanish footballer
January 15
Jordy Croux, Belgian footballer
Eric Dier, English footballer
January 24 – Juanpi, Venezuelan footballer  
January 27 – Jack Stephens, English footballer
March 6
Wesley Hoedt, Dutch footballer
Nathan Redmond, English footballer
March 13 – Gerard Deulofeu, Spanish footballer
March 17 – Marcel Sabitzer, Austrian footballer
March 27 – Yoan Cardinale, French goalkeeper
 April 13 – Kahraba, Egyptian footballer 
May 5 – Javier Manquillo, Spanish footballer
May 10 – Jamar Loza, Jamaican footballer
 May 27
 Maximilian Arnold, German footballer  
 João Cancelo, Portuguese footballer
 Aymeric Laporte, French-Spanish footballer  
June 9 – Viktor Fischer, Danish footballer 
June 15
 Vincent Janssen, Dutch footballer
 Iñaki Williams, Spanish footballer
 July 10 – Iuri Medeiros, Portuguese footballer
 July 11 – Lucas Ocampos, Argentine footballer
 July 25 – Jordan Lukaku, Belgian footballer 
 July 29 – Daniele Rugani, Italian footballer  
 August 3 – Corentin Tolisso, French footballer  
 August 10 – Bernardo Silva, Portuguese footballer
 August 18 – Morgan Sanson, French footballer
 August 28 – Junior Malanda, Belgian footballer (d. 2015)
 August 31 – Can Aktav, Turkish footballer 
 September 8 – Bruno Fernandes, Portuguese footballer 
 September 23 – Yerry Mina, Colombian footballer
 October 3 – Kepa Arrizabalaga, Spanish footballer  
 October 24 – Bruma, Portuguese footballer
 October 31 – Sherwin Skeete, Guyanese footballer
 November 10 – Óliver Torres, Spanish footballer
 November 21 – Saúl Ñíguez, Spanish footballer  
 December 2 – Cauley Woodrow, English club footballer
 December 5 – Grant Ward, English club footballer
 December 10 – Matti Klinga, Finnish youth international  
 December 29 – Louis Schaub, Austrian footballer

Deaths

January
 January 20 – Matt Busby, Scottish footballer and manager

March
 March 20 – Alfonso Rodríguez 'Foncho', Spanish footballer

April
 April 18 – Dener, Brazilian forward, 2 times capped for the Brazil national football team and active player of CR Vasco da Gama. (23 ; in a car crash)

May
 May 30 – Agostino Di Bartolomei, Italian footballer

July
 July 2 – Andrés Escobar, Colombian footballer (murdered)
 July 4 – Ştefan Dobay, Romanian footballer

September
 September 10 – Max Morlock, German international footballer (born 1925)

December
 December 31 – Bruno Pezzey, Austrian footballer (born 1955)

References

 
Association football by year